Armas Clifford "Mike" Markkula Jr. (born February 11, 1942) is an American electrical engineer, businessman and investor. He was the original angel investor, first chairman, and second CEO for Apple Computer, Inc., providing critical early funding and managerial support. At the company's founding, Markkula owned 26% of Apple, equivalent to each of the shares owned by cofounders Steve Jobs and Steve Wozniak.

Early life
Markkula's great-grandfather, Isak Ferdinand Markkula, was born in Sievi, Finland. He and his wife moved to the United States in either 1865 or 1883, depending on the source. Mike Markkula's first name Armas and last name Markkula are traditional Finnish names. His first name Armas means "dear" or "beloved" in the Finnish language.

Markkula earned Bachelor of Science and Master of Science degrees in electrical engineering from the University of Southern California.

Career
Markkula made millions from stock options he earned as a marketing manager for Fairchild Semiconductor and Intel, reaching financial independence and early retirement at 33. After that, he became a startup consultant and mentored dozens of entrepreneurs, working only every Monday.

Apple
Markkula was introduced by Regis McKenna and venture capitalist Don Valentine to Steve Jobs and Steve Wozniak while they were looking for funding to manufacture the Apple II personal computer they had developed after having sold some units of their first computer, the Apple I. Jobs and Wozniak had previously gone to McKenna and then Valentine, but neither was originally interested in the Apple pair; after meeting with the young and unkempt Jobs, Valentine asked McKenna, "Why did you send me this renegade from the human race?" However, Valentine forwarded their information to Markkula, who proved interested, and came out of retirement to personally work on the opportunity. 

With his guidance and funding, Apple ceased to be a partnership between Jobs and Wozniak, and was incorporated as a company on January 3, 1977. Markkula provided Apple with funding of $91,000 personally in addition to securing a $250,000 line of credit from Bank of America. He brought in his friend and former coworker Michael Scott as the first president and CEO, then replaced Scott with himself from 1981 to 1983 despite having originally promised his wife that he would only stay at Apple for four years, and then later planning to retire again by 1984; during the board meeting to confirm him as the CEO, Markkula received a phone call that his father-in-law and best friend had died.

Markkula served as chairman again from 1995 to 1997, when a new board was formed after Jobs returned to the company. As chairman he approved Jef Raskin's 1979 plan to start designing what would become the Macintosh, then prevented Jobs from killing the project in favor of his own Lisa. In 1985, Markkula took John Sculley's side in a dispute with Jobs, causing the latter to leave the company; he would later help to force Sculley out in 1993.

In addition to providing what The New York Times later described as "adult supervision" to the younger Jobs and Wozniak, as a trained engineer Markkula also possessed technical skills. Michael Tomczyk recalled being surprised by the technical sophistication of a software question Markkula asked Wozniak. He wrote several early Apple II programs, served as a beta tester for Apple hardware and software, and wrote one of the first three programs available for the unsuccessful Apple III. Wozniak was motivated to design the Disk II floppy disk drive system after Markkula found that a checkbook-balancing program he had written loaded too slowly from a data cassette. Markkula retired from Apple after Jobs returned as interim CEO in 1996. He supported Jobs' 1997 return and agreed to step down from Apple's board.

Steve Wozniak, who designed the first two Apple computers, credits Markkula for the success of Apple more than himself. Jeffrey Nordling portrayed him in the 1999 TNT film Pirates of Silicon Valley. Dermot Mulroney later portrayed him in the 2013 film Jobs.

After Apple
After he retired from Apple, he went on to work at Echelon Corporation, ACM Aviation, San Jose Jet Center and Rana Creek Habitat Restoration and to endow the Markkula Center for Applied Ethics at Santa Clara University, where he chaired the board. Markkula was also on the board of trustees of Santa Clara University from 2003 to 2009.

Markkula was an investor in Crowd Technologies, a startup developing a web application called Piqqem that applies the wisdom of crowds to stock market predictions. He is an investor in Scotland-based LiveCode Ltd.

References

Further reading
 Jeffrey Young, The Journey Is the Reward, 1987 (Jeffrey Young's biography covering Steve Jobs' life until shortly after he founded NeXT computer company)

External links
 Edwards, Jim (December 26, 2013). "These Pictures Of Apple's First Employees Are Absolutely Wonderful". Business Insider.
 Markkula, Mike (Armas Clifford, Jr.) oral history

1942 births
Living people
American people of Finnish descent
American technology chief executives
Apple Inc. executives
Directors of Apple Inc.
Intel people
USC Viterbi School of Engineering alumni